Expo is a Swedish anti-racist magazine started in 1995 by Stieg Larsson. It is issued by the non-profit Expo Foundation (Stiftelsen Expo). The magazine, issued four times a year, contains investigative journalism focused on nationalist, racist, anti-democratic, anti-semitic, and far-right movements and organisations. The people responsible for Expo make no connections with specific organisations or political parties, but work together with individuals and organisations that share Expos platform. The chairman of the Expo Foundation is Charles Westin. The magazine is headquartered in Stockholm.

The organisation has several parts. Expo Arkiv is an archive of far-right and anti-democratic events in Scandinavia. The archive is open to researchers, students, and individuals who need information. Expo Research is a research organisation whose members find and collect information on racist, anti-Semitic, and anti-democratic organisations in Sweden and Europe. The information comes from informants, defectors, public files, authorities, independent researchers, and so on.

The people responsible for Expo closely co-operate with Monitor in Norway and Searchlight in the UK. They also exchange information with groups and magazines such as Antifa Infoblatt in Germany, Reflexes and CRIDA in France, Tun Balalaika in Russia, and Nigdy Wiecej in Poland, as well as Institute for Research and Education on Human Rights (IREHR) and Center for New Community (CNC) in the United States.

Expo became widely known in Sweden in June 1996 following a string of threats and attacks directed against companies printing and selling the magazine, and organisations supporting it. The words "Inget stöd till kommunist-Expo" (No support for communist Expo) were painted on the wall of the Moderate Party headquarters. In response, leading tabloid newspapers Aftonbladet and Expressen printed and distributed the June 1996 issue as a free supplement, with a circulation of around 800,000 copies.

Financial pressures in 1998 forced the people responsible for Expo to cease publication of the magazine and replace it with a newsletter. In 1999, Expo was restarted as a part of the magazine Svartvitt. When Svartvitt shut down in 2003, Expo returned to publication as an independent magazine.

The editor-in-chief of Expo is Daniel Poohl. In 2014 the circulation of the magazine was 3,500 copies.

On Sunday 4 May 2016 the Expo photographer David Lagerlöf took an image of  Tess Asplund, 42, with fist raised against the leadership of the Nordic Resistance Movement (NRM) in Borlänge, central Sweden. This went viral in the country and was widely reprinted in the international press, seen as an iconic moment in modern Swedish history.

Stieg Larsson
Stieg Larsson, the author of the Millennium series of novels, was Expos co-founder and editor-in-chief from 1995 until his death in 2004. Larsson's political and journalistic background in far-left political activism including in Kommunistiska Arbetareförbundet (Communist Workers' League), and Internationalen, led him to found the Expo Foundation, similar to the British Searchlight Foundation, with the aim of "studying and mapping anti-democratic, right-wing extremist and racist tendencies in society".

See also
Bilan Osman
Andreas Rosenlund

Sources

External links
Expo Foundation - Official site (In Swedish)

1995 establishments in Sweden
Magazines established in 1995
Magazines published in Stockholm
Quarterly magazines published in Sweden
Political magazines published in Sweden
Swedish-language magazines
Anti-racism in Sweden